These Times is the sixth studio album by American alternative rock band The Dream Syndicate.

Track listing

Personnel
Steve Wynn - lead vocals, guitar
Jason Victor - guitar, backing vocals
Mark Walton - bass guitar
Dennis Duck - drums

Chris Cacavas - keyboards
Linda Pitmon, Stephen McCarthy - backing vocals

References

2019 albums
The Dream Syndicate albums
Albums produced by John Agnello
Anti- (record label) albums
Albums with cover art by Robert Beatty (artist)